Oak Grove is an unincorporated community in Okaloosa County, United States.

Notes

Unincorporated communities in Okaloosa County, Florida
Unincorporated communities in Florida